Russell Gleason (February 6, 1908 – December 25, 1945) was an American actor who began his career at the very beginning of the talking film era. Born into an acting family, one of his earliest roles was in the 1930 classic film, All Quiet on the Western Front. 

While still in the middle of a successful acting career, Gleason joined the U.S. Army in late 1943, during World War II. While awaiting deployment to Europe in December 1945 in New York City, Gleason fell to his death from a hotel window. He was the son of actors Lucille and James Gleason.

Early life
Gleason was born to actors Lucile (née Webster) and James Gleason on February 6, 1908, in Portland, Oregon, where his parents were acting in local theater productions. As a child, Gleason appeared on stage in some of the theatrical productions put on by his parents. His debut occurred when he was carried on stage by his grandmother to appear with his mother in The Heir to the Hooray. Growing up, he lived with his maternal grandmother in Oakland, California. During school years, he rarely saw his parents, but he acted with them in stock theater during summer vacations.

Career
Gleason's first foray into film was when he was 21, with a leading role in 1929's The Shady Lady, directed by Edward H. Griffith. The following year he had a critical success in his role of Private Mueller in the Oscar-winning film, All Quiet on the Western Front. His short career only spanned 15 years, during which time he appeared in over 50 feature films, mostly in featured or starring roles. He appeared with both of his parents in the film series surrounding The Higgins Family, of which nine films were made from 1938 to 1941. The Gleasons appeared in seven of those films, the last one being Grandpa Goes to Town in 1940 (the last two "Higgins" films were made with other actors). He would also appear in "The Jones Family" series, produced by 20th Century Fox.

After making his last film, The Adventures of Mark Twain, which finished production in September 1942, he joined the Army. His final four pictures would all be released in 1944, after he was already in the service.

Personal life

Early in his career, he was romantically linked with Mary Brian. Gleason was married to Cynthia Hobart (later Cynthia Lindsay), who was a stunt woman and swimmer, and later wrote a biography of Boris Karloff. The entire Gleason family were close friends with Karloff, and the young couple became the godparents to Karloff's daughter, Sara Jane. Hobart also co-wrote George Burns' autobiography with the actor. The Gleasons had a son, Michael, on June 1, 1939. After Russell Gleason's death, Cynthia remarried, to Lou Lindsay, and Michael took his step-father's last name, and went on to become a television producer.

Death
On December 25, 1945, Gleason was in New York City awaiting deployment to Europe with his regiment when he fell to his death out of a fourth story window in the Hotel Sutton on East 56th Street in Manhattan, which the army had commandeered to house the troops. Law enforcement was unable to determine whether Gleason's fall from the window had been accidental or a suicide. It had been reported in some publications, such as Variety, that Gleason had been prescribed a sulfonamide to treat a cold at the time, and that the drug had resulted in grogginess that led him to accidentally falling. 

He was interred at the Long Island National Cemetery, a military cemetery, on December 28, 1945.

Filmography

Notes

References

External links

 
 
 

1908 births
1945 deaths
Male actors from Oakland, California
Male actors from Portland, Oregon
American male film actors
20th-century American male actors
United States Army personnel of World War II
Accidental deaths from falls
Burials at Long Island National Cemetery
Accidental deaths in New York (state)